Chino Hills High School, abbreviated CHHS, is located in Chino Hills, California, United States and is a public comprehensive high school serving a student body from three cities in the Chino Valley Unified School District. The school was established in 2001 and is located in the City of Chino Hills, which is in the southwest corner of San Bernardino County. The City of Chino Hills was incorporated in 1991, and is now a community of 84,364. Chino Valley Unified School District serves over 29,000 students in Chino, Chino Hills, and south Ontario. The district employs over 2,600 people, and supports thirty-five schools including four comprehensive high schools and one continuation school.

The City of Chino Hills is in the midst of housing expansion, with multiple residential building projects under construction in the neighborhoods surrounding Chino Hills High School, and more homes under construction in neighboring Eastvale. This residential expansion is set to bring an enrollment increase to CHHS in the next several years. CHHS currently serves 2,891 students, whose student body reflects both ethnic and economic diversity. Although CHHS attendance area covers the southern portions of the district's three cities, from the hills to the agricultural preserve, 90% of students who attend Chino Hills High School come from Chino Hills. CHHS is the largest high school in the district.

CHHS’ graduation rate was 95% in 2011 and 2012, increasing to 96% in 2013. This is above the district rate of 89% and the state rate of 80% in 2013.  In 2013, the dropout rate at CHHS was 0.7%, down from 1.2% in 2011. This is lower than the district rate of 2%, the county rate of 4.2%, and the state rate of 3.9% in 2013. CHHS’ dropout rate is consistently less than district, county, and state totals.

History
In the early 2000s, the Chino Hills area was growing at a very rapid rate. Nearby Ruben S. Ayala High School was nearing 4,000 students and voters approved Measure M, a bond initiative to relieve overcrowding and build a second high school in Chino Hills. The first graduating class finished in 2005.

Facilities
The campus was completed in 2006 and includes a 450-seat theater, a large stadium, two gymnasiums, and two computer labs. A wood shop is used for theater set design class. Facilities also include designed-to-specification ceramics, video production, theater, band, cooking, an aquatics center and art classrooms.

Students 
The student population is fairly diverse demographically, and very diverse socioeconomically. Students come from some of the most wealthy and most disadvantaged areas in San Bernardino County. The demographic breakdown is as follows: 5% African American, 0.1% American Indian or Alaskan, 23% Asian, 41% Hispanic/Latino, .3% Pacific Islander, and 27% Caucasian, and 3% Multiple.

Academics 
Chino Hills High School offers 19 Advanced Placement courses, where 33% of students are enrolled. The school is attempting to re-configure its scheduling so that more AP classes can be offered as a result of high demand.
 The 21 AP classes offered for the 2020-2021 school year are:
AP Biology, AP Calculus AB, AP Calculus BC, AP Chemistry, AP English Language and Composition, AP English Literature and Composition, AP Research, AP Seminar, AP Environmental Science, AP European History, AP French Language, AP Japanese Language, AP Macroeconomics/AP Microeconomics, AP Physics, AP Psychology, AP Spanish Language, AP Spanish Literature, AP Statistics, AP U.S. Government & Politics, AP U.S. History, and AP Human Geography

Four foreign languages are offered at Chino Hills High: Spanish (1, 2, 3H, 4 AP, 5 AP), French (1, 2, 3H, 4 AP), Japanese (1, 2, 3H, 4 AP), and Mandarin Chinese (1, 2, 3 H, 4AP).
After graduation, approximately 59% attend a four-year university; 1% join the military, 3% attend technical college and 37% attend a community college.

Academies 
Chino Hills High has 2 academies that allow students who wish to pursue particular careers in the Academies may enroll.

Business Administration Hospitality and Tourism
 Health Science Academy

Extracurricular activities
The CHHS Dance Team is ranked one of the top teams in the nation, breaking all-time high school dance team records multiple years in a row. In both 2017 and 2018, the Dance Team placed first in seven different dance categories at both USA National Finals in Anaheim, CA and the Contest of Champions Nationals in Orlando, Florida. In 2016, the team received 1st place in the Small Lyrical Championship Division at USA Nationals in Anaheim, CA. The team is also recognized for its 2016 hip-hop routine that won multiple awards at regional and state competitions and was performed at the CIF Varsity Boys Basketball game at the Honda Center.

The CHHS Spiritleaders have frequently made both US Spiritleaders and USA nationals. The 2008 Mascots are the only CHHS spiritleading team to have medaled at the USA National Finals, taking 3rd in 2008.  Students can also participate in many after school variety sports, such as football, volleyball, wrestling, baseball, softball, boys' and girls' basketball, boys' and girls' water polo and swimming, boys' and girls' tennis, boys' and girls' golf, and track and field.
CHHS Boys’ Basketball won the CIF State Championship in 2018.

Chino Hills High School has an indoor percussion ensemble, competing in the WGI (Winter Guard International) Scholastic division. The school has won World Percussion championship titles in 2012, 2013, 2015, 2017, 2018 and 2019.
The CHHS Band Program has won the WGI Championships in Dayton, Ohio 3 times in a row as of February 2020. Their score in the 2017 (98.613) broke the record for highest score achieved in the history of the WGI Champs.

Notable alumni
 Ball brothers
Lonzo, basketball player for the Chicago Bulls
LiAngelo, basketball player for the Charlotte Hornets
LaMelo, basketball player for the Charlotte Hornets
 Justin Alexander Cole, an American football linebacker for the Winnipeg Blue Bombers of the Canadian Football League (CFL).
 Zach Collier, an outfielder formerly with the Washington Nationals organization, drafted to the Philadelphia Phillies.
 Ifomeno "Ifo" Ekpre-Olomu, an American football cornerback who is currently a free agent.
 Kyle Garlick, an outfielder for the Minnesota Twins.
 Kevin Guppy, a former American professional soccer player.
 Cory Nicholas Harkey, an American football tight end who is currently a free agent. 
 Tarek Morad, an American professional soccer player.
 Onyeka Okongwu, basketball player for the Atlanta Hawks
 Chris Parmelee, an American professional baseball right fielder and first baseman.
 Eli Scott, basketball player for the Loyola Marymount Lions 
 Jaclyn Swedberg, Miss April 2011 for Playboy Magazine Playmate of the Month for April 2011

References

High schools in San Bernardino County, California
Chino Hills, California
Public high schools in California
2001 establishments in California
Educational institutions established in 2001